Lubotzky is a Jewish surname. Notable people with the surname include:

Binyamin Eliav (Lubotzky), Israeli politician, diplomat, author and editor
Iser Lubotzky (Lubocki), member of the Vilna-ghetto’s underground, partisan, Irgun officer, and Israeli advocate
Alex lubotzky, Israeli mathematician, Israel Prize recipient (2018) and politician (member of the 14th Knesset)
Asael Lubotzky, Israeli physician, writer and biologist

See also
 Lubocki

German-language surnames
Jewish surnames
Yiddish-language surnames
Israeli families